Minuscule 879 (in the Gregory-Aland numbering), Nλ68 (von Soden), is a 16th-century Greek minuscule manuscript of the New Testament on parchment. It has not complex contents.

Description 

The codex contains the text of the Gospel of Lukes 6,29-12,10 on 105 paper leaves (size ), with a commentary. The text is written in one column per page, 28 lines per page.

Text 
The Greek text of the codex Kurt Aland did not place it in any Category.
It was not examined by the Claremont Profile Method.

History 

According to F. H. A. Scrivener and C. R. Gregory it was written in the 16th century. Currently the manuscript is dated by the INTF to the 16th century. Probably it was rewritten from minuscule 853.

The manuscript was added to the list of New Testament manuscripts by Scrivener (704e), Gregory (879e). Gregory saw it in 1886.

It was examined and described by Ernesto Feron and Fabiano Battaglini (like minuscule 878) and 880).

Currently the manuscript is housed at the Vatican Library (Ottob. gr. 100), in Rome.

See also 

 List of New Testament minuscules (1–1000)
 Biblical manuscript
 Textual criticism
 Minuscule 878

References

Further reading

External links 
 

Greek New Testament minuscules
16th-century biblical manuscripts
Manuscripts of the Vatican Library